The 2020 NRL Women's Premiership is the third season of professional women's rugby league in Australia. The competition will be coinciding with the 2020 NRL Finals Series.

Round 1

Round 2

Round 3

Grand Final

References

External links 
 

2020 NRL Women's season